Jiaxing Media, also known as Jay Walk Studio, is a Chinese entertainment and media company established in 2013 that primarily invests in and produces television shows catering to the younger market. It is headquartered in Beijing and owned in part by the actress Yang Mi.

History
2012: Jaywalk Studio is established by Yang Mi in collaboration with H&R Century Pictures.
2013: The company becomes official.
March 2014: Yang Mi and her two managers, Zeng Jia and Zhao Ruoxiao, invest US$450,000 into Jay Walk World Studio. Each owns 19% of the company's shares.
June 2017: The company announces that it has secured US$36.8 million of new shares. Consequently, the company's market capitalisation is worth US$700 million.
2017: Jaywalk Studio reached a deal with Walt Disney Studios to develop live action films in China.
2018: Jaywalk Studio announces a new subsidiary called Jaywalk Newjoy, which will serve as a management agency for a new generation of idols.

Artists

Independent Studio
Mimi Yang Mi (杨幂)
Dilraba Dilmurat (迪丽热巴)

Male
Vengo Gao Weiguang (高伟光)
Leon Zhang Yunlong (张云龙)
Wayne Liu Ruilin (刘芮麟)
Leon Lai Yi (赖艺)
Lawrence Wang Xiao (王骁)
Zhu Zijie (祝子杰)
Wang Yiming (王一鸣)
Yi Daqian (易大千)
Fan Zhixin (樊治欣)
Into1_daniel (周柯宇)
zhou hosan(leo)

Female
Maggie Huang Mengying (黄梦莹)
Bambi Zhu Xudan (祝绪丹)
Daisy Dai Si (代斯)
Faye Wang Yifei (王一菲)
Yuan Yuxuan (袁雨萱)
Li Tingting (李婷婷)
Sabrina Zhuang Dafei (庄达菲)
Cui Wenmeixiu (崔文美秀)
Feng Wanhe (冯琬贺)
Ge Shimin (葛施敏)
Qiu Tian (邱天)
Tian Jingfan (田京凡) 
Tian Xuan'ning (田轩宁)
Rita Wang Yijin (王艺瑾)
Bubble Zhu Linyu (朱林雨)

Former
Bian Yu (边宇)
Xiao Yuyu (肖雨雨)
Yang Chengcheng (杨诚诚)
Wang Lidan (王俐丹)
Sierra Li Xirui (李溪芮)
Hawick Liu Kaiwei (劉愷威)
Vin Zhang Binbin (张彬彬)
Viyo He Haonan (何浩楠)
Peter Qian Zhengyu (钱政宇)

Productions

Film

Television series

References 

Mass media companies of China
Companies based in Beijing
Mass media companies established in 2013
 
Chinese companies established in 2013